HMS Usk was a British U class submarine, of the second group of that class, built by Vickers Armstrong, Barrow-in-Furness. She was laid down on 6 November 1939 and was commissioned on 11 October 1940.

Career and loss 
Usk spent most of her short career operating in the Mediterranean. She sailed from Malta to patrol off the north west coast of Sicily on 19 April 1941. Usk was later ordered to alter her position due to intense anti-submarine activity. Subsequent events are unknown, but she most likely struck mines in the vicinity of Cape Bon some time after 25 April 1941. She was reported overdue on 3 May 1941.

Notes

References 
 
 

 

British U-class submarines
Ships built in Barrow-in-Furness
1940 ships
World War II submarines of the United Kingdom
Lost submarines of the United Kingdom
Ships lost with all hands
Maritime incidents in April 1941